A poison pen letter is malicious correspondence.

Poison Pen may also refer to:

 Poison Pen (album), a 2006 album by Chino XL
 "Poison Pen" (song), a 1986 song by Hoodoo Gurus
 Poison Pen (play), a 1937 play by Richard Llewellyn
 Poison Pen, a 1993 English play by Ronald Harwood
 Poison Pen (1939 film), a British film based on the 1937 play
 Poison Pen, a biography of American author and journalist Kitty Kelley by George Carpozi Jr.
 Poison Pen (2014 film), an Irish film with screenplay by Eoin Colfer
 Poison pen (weapon), an improvised North Korean weapon
 Poison Pen Films, a UK film company

See also
 Poisoned Pen Press, American publisher of mysteries